Lieka or Liekà was a former settlement in 19th and early 20th century Ethiopia, a major market town in the Oromo region southwest of Shoa. It has since lost its importance as a regional market to nearby Nekemte.

The village at the former site is now spelled Leka.

References

History of Ethiopia